Silver Mountain may refer to:

Mountain:
 Silver Mountain (San Bernardino County, California) a mountain northeast of Oro Grande, California.
Silver Mountain (Colorado)
Silver Mountain (San Miguel County, Colorado), a summit near Telluride
Silver Mountain (Idaho)
 Sierra de la Plata

Place:
Silver Mountain, California
Silver Mountain, Ontario
Potosí Peru